is a Japanese actress and former junior idol model. She was previously signed to Stardust Promotion, but left in 2009 to work freelance.

Career
Takeda made her first appearance as a model at the age of 11 in the music video of Maya Okamoto's Dear. The same year, she auditioned and won a role in Ojamajo Kids, a stage performance of Ojamajo Doremi, as Onpu Segawa.

Filmography

Television

Music video

Theatre

Publications

Photobooks 
 True Heart (July 2004)

References

External links
 Mako Blog (Takeda's official blog)

1990 births
Living people
Actresses from Tokyo
Japanese stage actresses
Japanese child actresses
Japanese female models
21st-century Japanese actresses
Former Stardust Promotion artists